Saanenmöser (el. 1279 m.) is a high mountain pass in the Bernese Oberland in the Alps in Switzerland.

It connects Zweisimmen and Saanen.

The Montreux-Oberland Bernois Railway (MOB) also crosses the pass. It is the highest point on the line. Saanenmöser railway station is nearby.

See also
 List of highest paved roads in Europe
 List of mountain passes
List of the highest Swiss passes

Mountain passes of Switzerland
Mountain passes of the Alps
Bernese Oberland
Mountain passes of the canton of Bern
Rail mountain passes of Switzerland